Vtoraya Pyatiletka is a rural locality (a settlement) in Krasnoslobodsk, Sredneakhtubinsky District, Volgograd Oblast, Russia. The population was 714 as of 2010.

References 

Rural localities in Sredneakhtubinsky District